Apoclausirion nigricorne is a species of beetle in the family Cerambycidae, the only species in the genus Apoclausirion.

References

Elaphidiini